The Golden Age of Looney Tunes is a collection of LaserDiscs released by MGM/UA Home Video in the 1990s. There were five sets made, featuring a number of discs, and each disc side represented a different theme, being made up of seven cartoons per side. The first volume was also released on VHS, with each tape representing one disc side.

Like many other Looney Tunes home video releases by MGM/UA Home Video, Volumes 1-4 used faded 35 mm Associated Artists Productions (a.a.p.) television prints as MGM/UA and Turner Entertainment, owners of the rights to the shorts, at the time had no access to Warner Bros.' negatives. Unlike many other Looney Tunes home video releases by MGM/UA Home Video, most of the a.a.p. logos were cut from the releases. 

As Volume 5 was released in 1997, however, newer "remasters" were used that Turner Entertainment had created in 1995, infamously known as Turner "dubbed versions", to make the shorts look more presentable for television and home video releases. These shorts had an altered ending card taken from one of the shorts with the disclaimer to Turner Entertainment below. Turner did not have access to Warner Bros.' negatives, so only what was provided from a.a.p. could be used, hence why some of the Turner prints are of varying quality.

With the exception of the "Censored Eleven" shorts, every Looney Tunes and Merrie Melodies short in the a.a.p./Turner library was released in this collection.

Volume 1
The first volume of the set, The Golden Age of Looney Tunes was released on December 11, 1991 on LaserDisc. Due to potentially offensive material in the cartoon Bugs Bunny Nips the Nips, later reprints were released with that short replaced by Racketeer Rabbit, which was also released on Volume 3. The first volume contains 70 animated shorts from 1931 through 1948 (1933–1948 on the cover). Each side of the first volume's discs contains animated shorts fitting a particular theme or category - this arrangement is used in all five volumes of The Golden Age of Looney Tunes. Each side was also released on VHS as ten separate volumes.
 Side 1, 1930's Musicals, featured several early entries in the Merrie Melodies series. Music played an integral part in each cartoon on this side. Including Tex Avery's I Love to Singa.
 Side 2, Firsts, featured debut cartoons for several major characters. One featured cartoon, Daffy Duck & Egghead, technically, was the first Daffy Duck cartoon in color, and the first where the character actually has that name. This was used because Turner did not own the rights to Porky's Duck Hunt, Daffy's actual debut. This copy of Daffy Duck and Egghead uses the Blue Ribbon titles but leaves the original end cue intact.
 Sides 3 through 6 were each dedicated to cartoons from one of the following directors: Tex Avery (side 3), Bob Clampett (side 4), Chuck Jones (side 5) and Friz Freleng (side 6)
 Side 7, Bugs Bunny by Each Director, was one of two Bugs-centric sides on the first volume. It featured at least one Bugs Bunny cartoon from each director that did at least one between 1940 through July 1948. Tex Avery, Bob Clampett, Chuck Jones, Robert McKimson and Frank Tashlin each directed one entry, while Friz Freleng directed two. Controversy rose up with Japanese-Americans for this disc including Bugs Bunny Nips the Nips, it was later replaced by Bugs Bunny Rides Again.
 Side 8, 1940's Zanies, featured several character-driven cartoons from the 1940s.
 Side 9, Hooray For Hollywood, was dedicated to cartoons in which show-business itself played a major part. Many cartoons on this side featured caricatures of notable celebrities of the time.
 Side 10, The Art of Bugs, was the other Bugs-centric side on the first volume. All three Cecil Turtle encounters are on this side, as are the debuts of Beaky Buzzard and Marvin the Martian. Another notable cartoon is The Old Grey Hare, which is famous for its end gag involving the title card.

Notes: This set also contains the original ending audio of Daffy Duck and Egghead, Speaking Of The Weather, Swooner Crooner and Have You Got Any Castles?

Volume 2
The Golden Age of Looney Tunes: Vol. 2 was released on July 1, 1992 on laserdisc. The second volume contains 70 animated shorts from 1931 through 1948. The second volume's categories are as follows:
 Side 1, Musical Madness, features several musical cartoons from the 1930s, including several Harman and Ising-era cartoons, and two early color entries (before the switch to three-strip Technicolor).
 Side 2, Early Wabbits, features all the color cartoons starring the Bugs Bunny prototype, and some early cartoons with Bugs himself.
 Sides 3 through 6 are again dedicated to cartoons from a single (or in one case, a pair of) director(s), in the following order: Frank Tashlin, Chuck Jones, Bob Clampett and McKimson/Davis
 Side 7, Fables & Fairy Tales, featured cartoons which parodied famous fairy tales.
 Side 8, The Art of Daffy, is dedicated to Daffy Duck. All four color Looney Tunes released in 1943 are on this side.
 Side 9, Best Supporting Players, featured cartoons starring several lesser-known characters
 Side 10, Variations on a Theme, was centered on sleep.

Volume 3
The Golden Age of Looney Tunes: Vol. 3 was released on December 23, 1992 on laserdisc. The third volume contains 70 animated shorts from 1931 through 1948. The third volume's categories are as follows:
 Side 1, Harman-Ising, exclusively featured cartoons from the era they headed the WB cartoon studio.
 Side 2, Bugs Bunny, features cartoons starring the titular character
 Sides 3 through 6, as with previous volumes, are each dedicated to cartoons from a particular director, in the following order: Chuck Jones, Friz Freleng, Early Avery, Tashlin/Clampett
 Side 7, Sports, featured cartoons dealing with the world of sport
 Side 8, The Evolution of Egghead, covers the evolution of Egghead into Elmer Fudd
 Side 9, Porky and Daffy, featured cartoons starring either character (with one pairing)
 Side 10, Politically Incorrect, had cartoons that featured stereotypes of Africans or Native Americans

Volume 4
The Golden Age of Looney Tunes: Vol. 4 was released on July 14, 1993 on laserdisc. The fourth volume contains 73 animated shorts from 1932 through 1948. The fourth volume's categories are as follows:
 Side 1, Bugs Bunny, was dedicated to the titular rabbit
 Side 2, Early Chuck Jones, featured early entries from that director
 Side 3, Friz Freleng, featured cartoons from that director
 Side 4, Cartoon All-Stars, had several character-driven cartoons and two one-shots
 Side 5, Radio Daze, featured cartoons centered on old-time radio or its stars
 Side 6, Frantic Forties, featured several one-shots from the 1940s
 Side 7, Wacky Blackouts, featured cartoons centered on sight gags
 Side 8, Ben Hardaway & Cal Dalton (and Private Snafu), featured cartoons from the Hardaway-Dalton team along with two Private Snafu cartoons
 Side 9, Sniffles, was dedicated to the titular mouse
 Side 10, Merrie Melodies, featured several early entries in that series.

Volume 5
The Golden Age of Looney Tunes: Vol. 5 was released on April 2, 1997 on laserdisc. The fifth volume contains 55 animated shorts from 1932 through 1949. The fifth volume came out over three and a half years after The Golden Age of Looney Tunes: Vol. 4 was released - by this point, Turner had been bought out by Time Warner. A majority of the shorts in this volume use the newer American 1995 Turner "dubbed" prints, except for  The Merry Old Soul, which has its original Associated Artists Productions print complete with the a.a.p. titles. Side 1 and Side 8 do not have Turner prints.

The final box set in the series contains bonus material such as an alternate version of Hare Ribbin and two live-action film segments with cameos by Bugs Bunny: My Dream Is Yours and Two Guys from Texas. The set also includes three World War II-era cartoon shorts featuring the sailor Hook that were made specially for the U.S. Armed Forces. The shorts are The Good Egg (not to be confused with the regular Warner Bros. short with the same name), The Return of Mr. Hook and Tokyo Woes. The fifth volume's categories are as follows:
 Side 1, Black and White Classics, features several cartoons from the Harman-Ising era
 Side 2, Early Avery, features early cartoons from Tex Avery
 Side 3, Freleng Follies, has a number of cartoons from Friz Freleng
 Side 4, Musical Madness, has several musical cartoons from the 1930s
 Side 5, Pesky Pets, features cartoons centered on animals normally kept as pets, including several Curious Puppies cartoons
 Side 6, Objects d'Art, features "objects come to life" cartoons
 Side 7, Animal Antics, features cartoons driven by all-animal casts
 Side 8, Supplement Material, features the bonus content

Available shorts
This is a listing of the shorts in the Warner Bros.' Looney Tunes and Merrie Melodies series (as well as a few non-Looney Tunes/Merrie Melodies shorts) available on The Golden Age of Looney Tunes set. See the Looney Tunes and Merrie Melodies filmography for a more detailed list of all the shorts. All films before Honeymoon Hotel are in black-and-white. Unless otherwise noted, all other cartoons are in three-strip Technicolor.Key'''
  = Looney Tunes
  = Merrie Melodies
  = was reissued as a Blue Ribbon Merrie Melodies short
 NT = Non-theatrical shorts
 X:Y = Volume X, Side Y
 *''  = Public domain
 Cine = Cinecolor
 Techni = Technicolor

References

External links 
 Warner Bros. Cartoons Filmography And Title Card Gallery

Looney Tunes home video releases
LaserDisc releases